The Estadio Pancho Pepe Cróquer is a baseball and softball stadium located in San Juan de los Morros, the capital city of Guarico state in Venezuela. It has a capacity of 3,000 people and is used for amateur play and special events. The stadium was named after Francisco José Cróquer, a distinguished sportscaster and racing driver who was popularly known as Pancho Pepe Cróquer.

Sources
Instituto Regional de Deporte del Estado Guárico
Google Maps 

Baseball venues in Venezuela
Sport in Guárico
2007 establishments in Venezuela